Stringtown was a community, now extinct, in Jefferson Township, Miami County, in the U.S. state of Indiana.

History
Stringtown was so named on account of its houses being strung along the road. In its heyday, the town had a saw mill, a general store, and a cabinet shop. The community became a ghost town when its residents eventually left, and nothing remains of it today.

References

Geography of Miami County, Indiana
Ghost towns in Indiana